Juho Ojanen (born 2 January 2002) is a Finnish footballer who plays as a midfielder for Ivy League side Harvard Crimson.

Club career

Early life
Born in Espoo, Ojanen joined the academy of Honka in 2006.

Honka
On 18 January 2018 Honka announced that it had signed a multi-year contract with his own protégé Juho Ojanen.

Greuther Fürth II
After a year in Honka´s senior squad it was announced that Ojanen was leaving the team in an international transfer. It was later announced that his new team was Greuther Fürth.

Klubi 04
On 17 May 2022 HJK reported that Ojanen had ended his contract with Greuther Fürth and would join HJK`s reserve team Klubi 04 for the summer before joining Harvard Crimson.

Harvard
On 1 August 2022 it was reported that Harvard University would add Ojanen and seven other first-years ahead of 2022 men’s soccer season.

International career
Ojanen has competed on the Finland national teams at the U15-U21 levels and has been a member of the national team program since 2017. He has 26 caps for Finland youth national teams. He won the International Federation Cup in Latvia with the Finland U17 team in 2018 and captained the Finland U15 and U16 sides in 2017 and 2018.

Career statistics

Club

Notes

References

2002 births
Living people
Footballers from Espoo
Harvard University alumni
Finnish footballers
Finland youth international footballers
Association football midfielders
Veikkausliiga players
Regionalliga players
FC Honka players
SpVgg Greuther Fürth players
SpVgg Greuther Fürth II players
Klubi 04 players
Harvard Crimson men's soccer players
Finnish expatriate footballers
Finnish expatriate sportspeople in Germany
Expatriate footballers in Germany
Finnish expatriate sportspeople in the United States
Expatriate soccer players in the United States